Etemadi is a surname. Notable people with the surname include:

Agil Etemadi (born 1987), Iranian-Dutch professional footballer
Mohammad Etemadi, Iranian professor in Electrical Engineering
Mohammad Nur Ahmad Etemadi (1921–1979), Afghan diplomat and politician
Raha Etemadi (born 1984), Iranian Lyricist, Producer, Director, Documentary Maker and Host of Manoto TV channel and Stage talent show
Zabih Etemadi (born 1982), Iranian former professional footballer

See also 
Etemadi's inequality, Probability theory